Thomas Bredsdorff (born 1 April 1937 in Silkeborg) is a Danish literary scholar and critic.

He received a Doctor of Philosophy in 1976 from the University of Copenhagen, where he was professor of Nordic literature from 1978 to 2004. He has written about books and culture for the Danish newspaper Politiken since 1965. He worked for Kristeligt Dagblad from 1959-1964. His books and articles are aimed at both academics and the general public.

Historically, Thomas Bredsdorff researched literature from the 13th through 20th centuries, but mainly focused on 18th-century literature, on which he wrote a thesis (1976) and which he later published as the dissertation  (2004).

He has been a guest lecturer and visiting professor at many universities abroad, including the University of California, Berkeley in 2005.

Honors and awards
2001 University of Lund Honorary Doctorate
2001 Order of the Dannebrog Knight 1st Class
2015 Swedish Academy Nordic Prize

Select works
1971 
1979  (in Swedish 1981)
1987 
1991  (in Swedish 1991)
2006 
2011 
2013

References

1937 births
University of Copenhagen alumni
Academic staff of the University of Copenhagen
Danish literary critics
Living people
Politiken people
People from Silkeborg